The 1953 World Table Tennis Championships mixed doubles was the 20th edition of the mixed doubles championship.  

Ferenc Sidó and Angelica Rozeanu defeated Žarko Dolinar and Ermelinde Wertl in the final by three sets to two.

Results

See also
 List of World Table Tennis Championships medalists

References

-